The  (VHD, HD) with headquarters in Frankfurt am Main, Germany, as well as in Zürich and Thun, Switzerland, was a German publishing house founded in 1961 and closed in 2013.

Overview 
The  with headquarters in Frankfurt am Main, Germany, was a German publishing house founded by Harri Deutsch in 1961 as a spin-off of the scientific bookstore Fachbuchhandlung Harri Deutsch (FHD), which had existed for about a decade earlier. Both were situated near Goethe-Universität Frankfurt am Main. Between 1963 and about 1979 the publisher also had an office in Zürich. Around 1974 another branch was opened in Thun.

The company's activities focussed mostly on textbooks and encyclopedic works in the areas of mathematics, physics, chemistry and other sciences and technologies, in the first three decades in particular titles licensed from publishers of the former Eastern Bloc including the East-German publishers Edition Leipzig, Akademie Verlag, VEB Bibliographisches Institut, VEB Verlag Enzyklopädie, VEB Fachbuchverlag Leipzig, VEB Deutscher Verlag der Wissenschaften, VEB Akademische Verlagsgesellschaft (AVG), the Russian publishers Nauka and MIR, and others. The publications, some of which came in colored plastic soft covers, were popular also for their often very affordable prices.

In 1997, Martin Kegel took over the active management of the company. After the death of the founder Harri Deutsch in 2000, the Swiss branch Verlag Harri Deutsch AG went into liquidation on 26 October 2000 and was dissolved on 22 August 2002. The German Harri Deutsch GmbH was reorganized into the Wissenschaftlicher Verlag Harri Deutsch GmbH on 19 January 2001 under Kegel's lead. With no successor in sight it stopped its business activities on 31 May 2013 to prepare for Kegel's retirement later that year. Selected stock and publishing rights were transferred to the German publisher Europa-Lehrmittel.

In a parallel development, the bookstore was sold off to the Heymanns group, Cologne, on 1 January 2001 as Buchhandlung Harri Deutsch GmbH, which went into insolvency and was taken over by Fachbuch Mediasales GmbH & Co. KG in Gladenbach in 2004. When this became insolvent as well in 2006, the bookstore was refounded by Kegel as Wissenschaftliche Verlagsbuchhandlung Harri Deutsch GmbH on 8 March 2007 until it was finally closed on 22 August 2013.

Selected publications 
Originally, this work by the Russians Bronstein and Semendjajew was translated and edited by Viktor and Dorothea Ziegler and Günter Grosche for the East-German publisher . Some contingents of the East German print runs were dedicated for Verlag Harri Deutsch who had obtained a license from Teubner for distribution of the title in Western countries.

The  (literally: Pocketbook of physics) by Horst Kuchling was another bestseller licensed from VEB Fachbuchverlag Leipzig.

Another highly regarded title, licensed from the East-German VEB Deutscher Verlag der Wissenschaften, was their German translation  of Vladimir Ivanovich Smirnov's seven-volume work  (A Course in Higher Mathematics).

Licensed from the Russian Verlag MIR (with permission from Nauka and VEB Deutscher Verlag der Wissenschaften) was the third German-English edition of  / Tables:  / Tables of Series, Products, and Integrals by Iosif Moiseevich Ryzhik and Izrail Solomonovich Gradshteyn in 1981.

This was a German translation of the renowned textbook  by Lev Davidovich Landau and Evgeny Mikhailovich Lifshitz. The title was also available in English as Course of Theoretical Physics.

Harri Deutsch also licensed a series of classical scientific works known as "Ostwalds Klassiker der exakten Wissenschaften" (originally edited by Wilhelm Ostwald) from VEB Akademische Verlagsgesellschaft.

Authored by Walter Greiner, the publisher also offered the title  (Theoretical physics) in 13 volumes. Some of these volumes were available in English translations, edited by David Allan Bromley and published by Springer-Verlag.

In 1999, Harri Deutsch introduced the electronic publishing series cliXX (for educational courses) and DeskTop (for encyclopedic publications) under the label hades (harri deutsch electronic science) under the editorial guidance of Horst Stöcker utilizing HTML structures.

See also 
 Pergamon Press
 Plenum Press

Notes

References

External links 
  (Archived web site of Verlag Harri Deutsch, 1999–2013)
  (Archived web site of Fachbuchhandlung Harri Deutsch, 1999–2003)
  (Web site of Europa-Lehrmittel)

Academic publishing companies
Publishing companies of Germany
Book publishing companies of Germany
Companies based in Hesse
Publishing companies established in 1961
Publishing companies disestablished in 2013